John Palaiologos or Palaeologus may refer to:

 John Palaiologos (brother of Michael VIII) (1225/30–1274), general, brother of Byzantine emperor Michael VIII
 John Palaiologos (son of Andronikos II) (1286–1307), governor of Thessalonica
 John Palaiologos (Caesar) (1288/89–1326), governor of Thessalonica
 John II, Marquess of Montferrat (1321–1372), Marquess of Montferrat in 1338–1372
 John V Palaiologos (1332–1391), Byzantine emperor in 1341–1391, with interruptions
 John III, Marquess of Montferrat (c. 1362–1381), Marquess of Montferrat in 1378–1381
 John VII Palaiologos (1370–1408), Byzantine emperor in 1390
 John VIII Palaiologos (1392–1448), Byzantine emperor in 1425–1448
 John IV, Marquess of Montferrat (1413–1464), Marquess of Montferrat in 1445–1464
 John Theodore Paleologus (1611–???), possibly a descendant of Thomas Palaiologos, Despot of the Morea